Tagora may refer to:

Eupterote or Tagora, a genus of moth
Talbot Tagora, an executive car developed by Chrysler Europe, produced by Peugeot Société Anonyme (PSA), and marketed under the Talbot marque after PSA took over Chrysler's European operations in 1978
 Tagora, one of the Less significant planets in the Noon Universe#Tagora
 The Hiveswap character, part of the 'Troll Call'